Grindelia turneri is a North American species of flowering plants in the family Asteraceae. It is native to northeastern Mexico, found only in the State of Nuevo León.

The plant produces only one flower head per flower stalk. Each head has 18-28 ray flowers surrounding many disc flowers.

References

turneri
Endemic flora of Mexico
Flora of Nuevo León
Plants described in 1990